Acanthotoca is a genus of moths in the family Geometridae. It was described by David Stephen Fletcher in 1979.

Species
 Acanthotoca graefi (Hulst, 1896)
 Acanthotoca graefii
 Acanthotoca muelleri

References
 

Ourapterygini
Geometridae genera